Giorgos Petrakis (born 8 February 1988) is a Greek professional football manager and former player, who is the current manager of Super League 2 club Kifisia.

Personal life
Giorgos Petrakis is the son of Giannis Petrakis.

References

1988 births
Living people
Greek football managers
Greek expatriate football managers
Irodotos FC managers
Ermis Zoniana F.C. managers
PGS Kissamikos managers
A.E. Karaiskakis F.C. managers
PAS Lamia 1964 managers
People from Heraklion